The 1919–20 Northern Football League season was the 27th in the history of the Northern Football League, a football competition in Northern England. South Bank were crowned champions via a three team playoff after they finished the season on 38 points along with Bishop Auckland and Crook Town.

Clubs

From the 13 clubs which competed in the 1914–15 season 4 did not reappear:
 Darlington St. Augustine's
 Leadgate Park
 Harrogate
 Grangetown Athletic

Also 5 new clubs joined the league:
 Redcar
 Auckland St. Helen's United
 Darlington Railway Athletic
 Grangetown St. Mary's
 West Hartlepool St. Joseph's

League table

Championship playoff

4 September 1920: Bishop Auckland 4–2 South Bank
11 September 1920: Crook Town 2–1 Bishop Auckland
18 September 1920: South Bank 4–0 Crook Town

References

1919-20
1919–20 in English football leagues